The Serpent’s Lair (2000) is a two disc collaborative album by the American ambient artists Steve Roach and Byron Metcalf.

In the music, Steve Roach used a technique called Groove Alchemy.

Track listing

Disc one: “The Serpent’s Lair”
”The Lair” (12:14)
”Rite of Passage” (14:09)
”Shedding the Skin” (5:39)
”Big Medicine” (12:53)
”Future Tribe” (8:30)
”Birthright” (5:59)
”Osmosis”(4:04)
”Egg Chamber Dreaming” (8:53)

Disc two: “Offerings from the Underworld”
”Offering in Waves” (10:55)
”Impending Sense of Calm” (9:03)
”Cave Dwellers” (23:08)
”Primal Passage” (4:47)
”Serpent Clan” (5:02)
”Breathing Heart of the Dragon Mother” (6:50)
”Ochua” (9:26)

Personnel
Steve Roach (synthesizers, samplers, percussion, didgeridoo, breath, shakers, ocarinas, voice)
Byron Metcalf (percussion, frame drums, djembe, tom-toms, bass drum, clay pots, shakers, rattles, ashiko, rainstick)
Vicki Richards (violin)
Lena Stevens (voice)
Vidna Obmana (guitar)
Jeffrey Fayman (djembe)
Momodu Kah (djembe)
Jorge Reyes (flutes, ocarinas, whistles, percussion, voice)
Jim Cole (voices)
Vir Unis (synthesizers)

References

2000 albums
Steve Roach (musician) albums
Collaborative albums